Halit Armay High School is a high school in Istanbul, Kucukyali, Turkey. It has 2000 student capacity and was established in 1992. Halit Armay is a four years high school.

High schools in Istanbul
1992 establishments in Turkey
Educational institutions established in 1992
Maltepe, Istanbul